Lists of newspapers in Korea include:

List of newspapers in North Korea
List of newspapers in South Korea